Analytical technique is a method used to determine a chemical or physical property of a chemical substance, chemical element, or mixture. There is a wide variety of techniques used for analysis, from simple weighing to advanced techniques using highly specialized instrumentation

Classical methods of analysis 
Classical analysis methods involve basic analytical methods widely used in laboratories. Gravimetric analysis measures the weight of the sample. Titrimetry is a technique used to determine the concentration of the analyte.

Spectrochemical analysis 
Spectrometer can determine chemical composition through its measure of spectrums. The common spectrometer used in analytical chemistry is Mass spectrometry. In a mass spectrometer, a small amount of sample is ionized and converted to gaseous ions, where they are separated and analyzed according to their mass-to-charge ratios.

Electroanalytical analysis 
Electroanalytical methods utilize the potential or current of a electrochemical cell. The three main sections of this type of analysis are potentiometry, coulometry and voltammetry. Potentiometry measures the cell's potential, coulometry measures the cell's current, and voltammetry measures the change in current when cell potential changes.

Chromatography 
Chromatography separates the analyte from the rest of the sample so that it may be measured without interference from other compounds. There are different types of chromatography that differ from the media they use to separate the analyte and the sample. In Thin-layer chromatography, the analyte mixture moves up and separates along the coated sheet under the volatile mobile phase. In Gas chromatography, gas separates the volatile analytes. A common method for chromatography using liquid as a mobile phase is High-performance liquid chromatography.

See also
 List of chemical analysis methods
List of materials analysis methods
Microanalysis
 Ion beam analysis
 Rutherford backscattering spectroscopy
 Nuclear reaction analysis
Radioanalytical chemistry
 Calorimeter

References

Analytical chemistry